Micah Sloat (born May 8, 1981) is an American theatre actor and musician, largely known for his leading role as Micah in the 2007 hit horror film, Paranormal Activity. He appeared in the horror sequel in 2010, Paranormal Activity 2 and a cameo in the spin-off film, Paranormal Activity: The Marked Ones, in 2014.

Life and career
Sloat was born in Westport, Connecticut, as the oldest of six siblings. He obtained his bachelor's degree in Philosophy from Skidmore College in 2004.

Sloat plays both rock and blues on the guitar and also sings with the world champion Westminster barbershop chorus. In 2005, Sloat moved to Los Angeles and attended the Musicians Institute in Hollywood and began studying acting.

He was still taking classes when he noticed a casting advertisement for Paranormal Activity in the spring of 2006. The ad asked for unknown actors with the ability to improvise who could work during the night without knowing what the next scene would entail.

Released widely in 2009, Paranormal Activity proved to be an unexpected hit at the box office, grossing more than $190 million worldwide. He returned to the Paranormal Activity franchise in the film's prequel, and had a cameo appearance in the series' spin-off, Paranormal Activity: The Marked Ones, in 2014.

Filmography

Film

References

External links

1981 births
Living people
American male film actors
Male actors from Connecticut
American blues guitarists
American rock guitarists
American male singers
Male actors from Los Angeles
People from Westport, Connecticut
Skidmore College alumni
Musicians from Los Angeles
Musicians Institute alumni